James Driscoll is an American former track and field athlete who competed in the hammer throw. Driscoll represented the United States at the 1993 World Championships in Athletics, taking part in the qualifying round only.

He returned to the competition four years later but failed to defend his title, finishing in sixth place. At national level, he was runner-up for two years running at the USA Outdoor Track and Field Championships in 1993 and 1994. He regularly finished fourth at the national championships, doing so in 1989 to 1992 and again in 1995.

After retiring in 1996 he moved on to throws coaching, training young athletes in Corona del Mar.  He lives with his wife Jane Buchan in Newport Coast, California.

International competitions

References

External links

Living people
1965 births
American male hammer throwers
Pan American Games track and field athletes for the United States
Pan American Games gold medalists for the United States
Pan American Games medalists in athletics (track and field)
Athletes (track and field) at the 1991 Pan American Games
Athletes (track and field) at the 1995 Pan American Games
World Athletics Championships athletes for the United States
Medalists at the 1991 Pan American Games